Saint-Aquilin-de-Pacy (literally Saint-Aquilin of Pacy) is a former commune in the Eure department, Normandy, France. On 1 January 2017, it was merged into the commune Pacy-sur-Eure.

Population

See also
Communes of the Eure department

References

Former communes of Eure